"Wings" is a song by English musician Birdy. The song was released as a digital download on 29 July 2013 and in the United Kingdom on 8 September 2013 as the lead single from her second studio album, Fire Within (2013). A remix by Nu:Logic was later released on 27 January 2014 as part of the "Hospital: We Are 18" LP from Hospital Records. The song peaked at number eight on the UK Singles Chart, making it her highest-charting single to date and her only top-ten single. It also reached number one in Ireland, becoming her sole top-ten single there as well, and peaked within the top three of five other countries.

Music video
A music video to accompany the release of "Wings" was first released onto YouTube on 2 August 2013 at a total length of four minutes and twenty-five seconds. The video shows Birdy with guests at a flamboyant mansion party, complete with masks, fencing and horses. It was directed by Sophie Muller.

Track listings

Charts

Weekly charts

Year-end charts

Certifications

In popular culture
The song was featured in trailers for Winter's Tale, Labor Day, the season three finale of Game of Thrones, the season five finale of The Vampire Diaries and one episode of Catfish: The TV Show.
In 2015, it was also used as the soundtrack of the Lloyds Horse Story 250 year anniversary advert, resulting in its return to the UK Singles Chart, reaching a new peak of number 8. Birdy performed the song at the 2016 BBC Festival of Remembrance. The song was covered by British rock band Nothing But Thieves for the BBC Radio 1 Live Lounge series.

References

14th Floor Records singles
2013 singles
Atlantic Records singles
Birdy (singer) songs
Irish Singles Chart number-one singles
Music videos directed by Sophie Muller
Song recordings produced by Ryan Tedder
Songs written by Ryan Tedder
Warner Music Group singles